Cill Fhíonáin or similar names may refer to:

 Kilfinane, County Limerick, Ireland, a small town
 Killynan (Cooke), County Westmeath, Ireland, a townland
 Kilfinan, Argyll and Bute, Scotland, a hamlet